Elections to the Akmola Regional Mäslihat were held on 10 January 2021 to elect the 32 members of the 7th Akmola Regional Mäslihat to coincide with the 2021 Kazakh local elections. It was the first election to be held under newly implemented proportional representation.

Nur Otan (NO) won a majority of 26 seats, followed by Ak Zhol and Auyl People's Democratic Patriotic Party with both winning 3 seats. The first session of the newly elected 7th Regional Mäslihat convened on 15 January 2021. From there, Murat Balpan (NO) was elected as the new Mäslihat Secretary.

Background 
Following the constitutional amendments in 2018, all local elections were made to be elected through party-list proportional representation.

On 22 October 2020, elections to the Akmola Regional Mäslihat were scheduled to be held on 10 January 2021, the same date as the local and Mazhilis elections. The Nur Otan party held a conference on 17 November 2020 where the delegates approved party-list of 58 candidates as well as the election program in improving lives of the Akmola citizens. By 11 December 2020, the Akmola Election Commission registered in total of 72 candidates from 4 parties except for People's Party of Kazakhstan (QHP) which refused to contest seats in the regional mäslihat.

Parties

Results

References 

Elections in Akmola Region
2021 elections in Kazakhstan